Tussenwater is an above-ground subway station of the Rotterdam Metro lines C and D. The station is located in the borough Hoogvliet in Rotterdam.

The station is situated just before the tracks of lines C and D split. Because of this, the station has four running tracks, which are situated along three platforms. The northern two tracks (for southbound/westbound trains) share one platform, while the southern two tracks each have their own platform. Because the line C track passes the line D tracks on a fly-over just east of the station, the platform for the eastbound line C trains is located higher than the other platforms.

External links

Rotterdam Metro stations
Railway stations opened in 2002
2002 establishments in the Netherlands
Railway stations in the Netherlands opened in the 21st century